The Champion Ballroom Academy (founded April 1990) is a dance studio in San Diego, California.  The studio's main specialties are social partner-dancing, competitive ballroom dance (aka. Dancesport) and the Latin-dance-based aerobic program called Core Rhythms.

The studio is also known for hosting weekly social dances open to the public, along with other monthly events hosted by local dance and social organizations.

Since founder Mary Murphy's casting as a judge of the Fox TV series So You Think You Can Dance, the studio has expanded its repertoire to include guest instructors of other dance styles, including hip hop, flamenco, and contemporary dance.

The studio also hosts at least two showcase parties per year, which include judged dance contests, professional exhibitions, and special guest performances of ballroom and other dance styles.

Special guests and showcase highlights have included: 
Benji Schwimmer - winner of So You Think You Can Dance
 Anna Trebunskaya, Louis van Amstel - professionals on Dancing with the Stars
 Dmitry Chaplin, Artem Chigvintsev, Ryan Conferido, Ashlé Dawson - finalists of SYTYCD
 Ron Montez, Tony Meredith, Melanie LaPatin, Rick Valenzuela - Latin dance champions
 Michael Mead, Toni Redpath, Hunter & Maria Johnson - Smooth ballroom champions
 Jaana Kunitz, Julia Gorchakova - dance champions and creators of Core Rhythms©

See also
Mary Murphy (choreographer)

References

External links
Champion Ballroom Academy website
Mary Murphy

Ballroom dance
Dance schools in the United States
Dance venues in the United States
Dance in California
Education companies established in 1990
Companies based in San Diego
Ballrooms in the United States
1990 establishments in California